Criswell may refer to:

People:
 The Amazing Criswell (1907–1982), American psychic
 Cooper Criswell (born 1996), American baseball player
 Dana Criswell (born 1963), American politician
 David Criswell, American astronomer
 Deanna Criswell (1971–1987), American murder victim
 Jeff Criswell (born 1964), American football offensive lineman
 Kim Criswell (born 1957), American musical entertainer and actress
 Kirby Criswell (born 1957), American linebacker for the St. Louis Cardinals
 Millie Criswell (born 1948), American novelist
 Ralph Luther Criswell (1861–1947), American politician
 Robert W. Criswell (1850–1905), American humorist and newspaperman
 W. A. Criswell (1909–2002), American pastor, author, and past president of the Southern Baptist Convention
Other:
 Criswell College, a liberal arts college in Dallas, Texas

See also
Chiswell (surname)
Creswell (surname)